Debden Airport  is an aerodrome adjacent to Debden, Saskatchewan, Canada.

See also 
List of airports in Saskatchewan

References

External links
Page about this airport on COPA's Places to Fly airport directory

Registered aerodromes in Saskatchewan